Petrovka is a rural locality (a village) in Dedovsky Selsoviet, Fyodorovsky District, Bashkortostan, Russia. The population was 3 as of 2010.

Geography 
It is located 8 km from Fyodorovka.

References 

Rural localities in Fyodorovsky District